Großwaldbach is a river of Bavaria, Germany. At its confluence with the Falkenseebach in Inzell, the Rote Traun is formed.

See also
List of rivers of Bavaria

References

Rivers of Bavaria
Rivers of Germany